Céline Baril (born 1953) is a Canadian artist and film director.

Early life
Baril was born in Gentilly, Quebec. In 1982, she earned a Bachelor of Fine Arts in degree from the Université du Québec à Montréal.

Career
Her film 24 Davids was selected as the opening film of the 20th Rencontres internationales du documentaire de Montréal.

Her work is included in the collections of the Musée national des beaux-arts du Québec, the Cinematheque quebecoise and the National Film Board of Canada

Filmography
Le Fourmi et le volcan - 1992
Barcelone - 1989
Le port des parfums - 1992
L'Absent - 1997
Games of the Heart (Du pic au cœur) - 2000
Giselle - 2003

See also
 List of female film and television directors

References

1953 births
20th-century Canadian women artists
21st-century Canadian women artists
Film directors from Quebec
Living people
Canadian women film directors
Canadian documentary film directors
Canadian video artists
Women video artists
Canadian women documentary filmmakers